Moise Vass (18 May 1920 – 12 November 2005) was a Romanian footballer who played as a right back. After he ended his playing career, Vass worked as a manager at Indagrara Arad.

International career
Moise Vass played two games at international level for Romania at the 1948 Balkan Cup, the first was a 1–0 loss against Albania and the second was a 3–2 victory against Bulgaria.

Honours
Kolozsvári AC
Magyar Kupa runner-up: 1943–44
Flamura Roșie Arad
Divizia A: 1946–47, 1947–48, 1950
Cupa României: 1947–48

References

External links

Moise Vass at Labtof.ro

1920 births
2005 deaths
Romanian footballers
Romania international footballers
Association football defenders
Liga I players
Liga II players
Nemzeti Bajnokság I players
FC UTA Arad players
Romanian expatriate footballers
Expatriate footballers in Hungary
Expatriate sportspeople in Hungary
Romanian expatriates in Hungary
Romanian expatriate sportspeople in Hungary
Romanian football managers
People from Turda